Sandridge was an electoral district of the Victorian Legislative Assembly. It existed from 1859 until 1889, when it was abolished and replaced with Port Melbourne, reflecting the name change of the suburb at its centre. Frederick Derham, the last member for the seat, continued as member for Port Melbourne.

Sandridge was defined by the Electoral Act Amendment Act 1858 (taking effect at 1859 elections) as:

Members for Sandridge

 = elected in a by-election

References

Former electoral districts of Victoria (Australia)
1859 establishments in Australia
1889 disestablishments in Australia